LOVE FM may refer to one of FM broadcasting stations:

 LOVE FM (Belize), a radio station based in Belize City, Belize
 Love FM (Japan) (aka JOFW-FM), a radio station based in Fukuoka City, Japan